Frank Lester VC (18 February 1896 – 12 October 1918) was an English soldier in the British Army during the First World War, and recipient of the Victoria Cross, the highest and most prestigious award for gallantry in the face of the enemy awarded to British Commonwealth forces.

Life
Lester was born on 18 February 1896 in Huyton, near Liverpool, to John and Ellen Lester, Prior to becoming a soldier, he was the organist at the Methodist chapel in Irby. He enlisted in the army in March 1916 and was posted to the 10th Battalion of the South Lancashire Regiment. He was soon promoted to the rank of Sergeant Instructor, training recruits at Prees Heath, Shropshire and Kinmel Park, North Wales. In June 1917 he was transferred at his own request to the Lancashire Fusiliers and in December that year he was drafted to France with the 10th Battalion of that regiment. In going overseas he relinquished the rank of Sergeant Instructor and reverted to Private.

In the winter of 1918, now promoted to corporal, Lester was wounded during the massive German offensive and was sent to Rouen for treatment. On leaving hospital he returned to England to await another posting. After some leave he was sent to Cromer, Norfolk and in September was sent back to the front in France.

Victoria Cross
Lester was part of the British offensive which was steadily pushing the German front line back. They encountered stiff resistance, the Germans were determined to prevent a rout of the "impregnable" Hindenburg Line and fighting for survival. It was 12 October 1918, in driving rain and sleet, that the 22 year-old corporal in the 10th Battalion, The Lancashire Fusiliers performed a deed for which he was awarded the VC.

Legacy
He is at buried in row B, grave 15 in Neuvilly Communal Cemetery Extension, France, located three miles north of Le Cateau. He is also commemorated on the family memorial in the graveyard of the former Holy Trinity Church, Wirral, and on the War Memorial in the graveyard of St Bartholomew's Church, Thurstaston.

His VC is on display in the Lord Ashcroft Gallery at the Imperial War Museum, London.

References

Monuments to Courage (David Harvey, 1999)
The Register of the Victoria Cross (This England, 1997)
VCs of the First World War - The Final Days 1918 (Gerald Gliddon, 2000)
Liverpool VCs (James Murphy, Pen and Sword Books, 2008)

External links
Burial location of Frank Lester "France"
News item "Frank Lester's Victoria Cross sold at auction"

1896 births
1918 deaths
British World War I recipients of the Victoria Cross
Lancashire Fusiliers soldiers
British military personnel killed in World War I
British Army personnel of World War I
Victoria Cross awardees from Liverpool
South Lancashire Regiment soldiers
British Army recipients of the Victoria Cross
People from Huyton